The Zohar Bridge (Gesher Zohar) is a bridge on Highway 90 near the Dead Sea in Israel. In terms of sea level, it is the lowest bridge on Earth. Located 40 meters above the river bed, it has maximum span of 52 meters.

See also
Neve Zohar

References

Bridges in Israel
Dead Sea
1997 establishments in Israel
Bridges completed in 1997